Nanofiction may refer to:
Nanofiction, a term commonly used to refer to various types of microfiction or very short writing, including that that fits the constraints of the website Twitter, also called twitterature, Twitter fiction or twiction.
Nanoism, a journal of this type of fiction.
Nanofiction, a type of flash fiction exactly 55 words long

See also
Nanofictionary, a game by Andrew Looney
The online nanofiction journal Nanoism: http://nanoism.net/